Hans Ruedi Giger (5 February 1940 – 12 May 2014) was a Swiss artist best known for his airbrushed images that blended human physiques with machines, an art style known as "biomechanical". Giger later abandoned airbrush for pastels, markers and ink. He was part of the special effects team that won an Academy Award for the visual design of Ridley Scott's 1979 sci-fi horror film Alien, and was responsible for creating the titular Alien itself. His work is on permanent display at the H.R. Giger Museum in Gruyères, Switzerland. His style has been adapted to many forms of media, including album covers, furniture, tattoos and video games.

Early life
Giger was born in 1940 in Chur, the capital city of Graubünden, the largest and easternmost Swiss canton. His father, a pharmacist, viewed art as a "breadless profession" and strongly encouraged him to enter pharmacy. He moved to Zürich in 1962, where he studied architecture and industrial design at the School of Applied Arts until 1970.

Career

Giger's first success was when H. H. Kunz, co-owner of Switzerland's first poster publishing company, printed and distributed Giger's first posters, beginning in 1969.

Giger's style and thematic execution were influential. He was part of the special effects team that won an Academy Award for Best Achievement in Visual Effects for their design work on the film Alien. His design for the Alien was inspired by his painting Necronom IV and earned him an Oscar in 1980. His books of paintings, particularly Necronomicon and Necronomicon II (1985) and the frequent appearance of his art in Omni magazine contributed to his rise to international prominence. Giger was admitted to the Science Fiction and Fantasy Hall of Fame in 2013. He is also well known for artwork on several music recording albums including Danzig III: How The Gods Kill by Danzig, Brain Salad Surgery by Emerson, Lake & Palmer, Attahk by Magma, Heartwork by Carcass, To Mega Therion by Celtic Frost, Eparistera Daimones and Melana Chasmata by Triptykon, Deborah Harry's KooKoo, "Atomic Playboys" by Steve Stevens and Frankenchrist, by the Dead Kennedys.

In 1998, Giger acquired the Saint-Germain Castle in Gruyères, Switzerland, which now houses the H.R. Giger Museum, a permanent repository of his work.

Personal life
Giger had a relationship with Swiss actress Li Tobler until she died by suicide in 1975. Tobler's image appears in many of his paintings. He married Mia Bonzanigo in 1979; they divorced a year and a half later.

Giger lived and worked in Zürich with his second wife, Carmen Maria Scheifele Giger, who is the director of the H.R. Giger Museum.

On 12 May 2014, Giger died in a Zürich hospital after suffering injuries from a fall.

Style
Giger started with small ink drawings before progressing to oil paintings. For most of his career, he worked predominantly in airbrush, creating monochromatic canvasses depicting surreal, nightmarish dreamscapes. He also worked with pastels, markers and ink.

Giger's most distinctive stylistic innovation was that of a representation of human bodies and machines in cold, interconnected relationships, which he described as "biomechanical". His main influences were painters Dado, Ernst Fuchs, and Salvador Dalí. He was introduced to Dali by painter Robert Venosa. Giger was also influenced by Polish sculptor Stanislaw Szukalski, and by painters Austin Osman Spare and Mati Klarwein, and was a personal friend of Timothy Leary. He studied interior and industrial design at the School of Commercial Art in Zurich from 1962 to 1965, and made his first paintings as art therapy.

Other works

Giger directed a number of films, including Swiss Made (1968), Tagtraum (1973), Giger's Necronomicon (1975) and Giger's Alien (1979).

Giger created furniture designs, particularly the Harkonnen Capo Chair for a film of the novel Dune that was to be directed by Alejandro Jodorowsky. Many years later, David Lynch directed the film, using only rough concepts by Giger. Giger had wished to work with Lynch, as he stated in one of his books that Lynch's film Eraserhead was closer than even Giger's own films to realizing his vision.

Giger also applied his biomechanical style to interior design. One "Giger Bar" appeared in Tokyo, but the realization of his designs was a great disappointment to him, since the Japanese organization behind the venture did not wait for his final designs, and instead used Giger's rough preliminary sketches. For that reason Giger disowned the Tokyo bar. The two Giger Bars in his native Switzerland, in Gruyères and Chur, were built under Giger's close supervision and they accurately reflect his original concepts. At The Limelight in Manhattan, Giger's artwork was licensed to decorate the VIP room, the uppermost chapel of the landmarked church, but it was never intended to be a permanent installation and bore no similarity to the bars in Switzerland. The arrangement was terminated after two years when the Limelight closed.

Giger's art has greatly influenced tattooists and fetishists worldwide. Under a licensing deal Ibanez guitars released an H. R. Giger signature series: the Ibanez ICHRG2, an Ibanez Iceman, features "NY City VI", the Ibanez RGTHRG1 has "NY City XI" printed on it, the S Series SHRG1Z has a metal-coated engraving of "Biomechanical Matrix" on it, and a 4-string SRX bass, SRXHRG1, has "N.Y. City X" on it.

Giger is often referred to in popular culture, especially in science fiction and cyberpunk. William Gibson (who wrote an early script for Alien 3) seems particularly fascinated: A minor character in Virtual Light, Lowell, is described as having New York XXIV tattooed across his back, and in Idoru a secondary character, Yamazaki, describes the buildings of nanotech Japan as Giger-esque.

Films
 Dune (designs for Alejandro Jodorowsky's unproduced adaptation of Frank Herbert's novel; the separate movie Dune was later made in an adaptation by David Lynch)
 Alien (designed, among other things, the Alien creature, "The Derelict" and the "Space Jockey")
 Aliens (credited for the creation of the creature only)
 Alien 3 (designed the dog-like Alien bodyshape, plus a number of unused concepts, many mentioned on the special features disc of Alien 3, despite not being credited in the movie theater version)
 Alien Resurrection (credited for the creation of the creature only)
 Alien vs. Predator (credited for the creation of the creature only)
 Aliens vs. Predator: Requiem (credited for the creation of the creature only)
 Poltergeist II: The Other Side
 Killer Condom (creative consultant, set design)
 Species (designed Sil, and the Ghost Train in a dream sequence)
 Species II (the film includes Eve, based on creature Sil from the first Species film)
 Batman Forever (unused design of a radically different Batmobile)
 Future-Kill (designed artwork for the movie poster)
 Tokyo: The Last Megalopolis (creature designs)
 Prometheus (The film includes "The Derelict" spacecraft and the "Space Jockey" designs from the first Alien film, as well as a "Temple" design from the failed Jodorowsky Dune project and original extraterrestrial murals created exclusively for Prometheus, based in conceptual art from Alien. Unlike Alien Resurrection, the Prometheus film credited H. R. Giger with the original designs.)
 Alien: Covenant (the film includes the Alien creature,  "The Derelict" spacecraft and the "Space Jockey" designs from the first Alien film)

Work for recording artists

 Celtic Frost: To Mega Therion
 Magma: Attahk
 Emerson, Lake & Palmer: Brain Salad Surgery 
 Floh de Cologne: Mumien 
 Steve Stevens' Atomic Playboys
 Deborah Harry, portraits for KooKoo album cover and videos "Backfired" and "Now I Know You Know" 
 hide: Hide Your Face
 Carcass: Heartwork 
 Danzig: Danzig III: How the Gods Kill
 Dead Kennedys' album Frankenchrist, Poster insert of Landscape XX (which led to an obscenity trial)
 Atrocity – Hallucinations
 Korn's Jonathan Davis commissioned Giger to design and sculpt a microphone stand, with the requirement that it be biomechanical, erotic, and movable. The contract allowed for five aluminium microphone stands to be made, but Davis purchased only two of the three to which he was entitled. The design of the microphone stand was later adapted to Giger's Nubian Queen, transforming it into a fine art sculpture.
 Helped to design the first professional video clip of "Böhse Onkelz" called "Dunkler Ort" (dark location) from their album Ein böses Märchen ... aus tausend finsteren Nächten, which was released in 2000.
 Ibanez Guitars released a series of H. R. Giger Signature Models with artwork on the body.
 Triptykon: Eparistera Daimones
 Triptykon: Melana Chasmata

Interior decoration
 Giger Bars in Switzerland's Chur and Gruyères
 Maison d'Ailleurs (House of Elsewhere) in Yverdon-les-Bains

Video games
 Dark Seed and its sequel, Dark Seed II, both adventure games for the Amiga, Macintosh, and PC, were developed by Cyberdreams and directly based on Giger's input.
 The dark fantasy games Tormentum: Dark Sorrow and its sequel Tormentum II are both based heavily on the works of Giger and Zdzisław Beksiński.
 Scorn, the sci-fi horror video game draws heavy inspiration from Giger's (and Zdzisław Beksiński's) work, frequently being compared with Giger's films Alien and Prometheus.

Recognition

Giger was awarded the Inkpot Award in 1979.

In addition to his awards, Giger was recognized by a variety of festivals and institutions. On the one year anniversary of his death, the Museum of Arts and Design in New York City staged the series The Unseen Cinema of HR Giger in May 2015.

Dark Star: H. R. Giger's World, a biographical documentary by Belinda Sallin, debuted 27 September 2014 in Zurich, Switzerland.

In July 2018, the asteroid 109712 Giger was named in his memory.

References

External links

 
 Museum HR Giger
 
 
 
 

 
1940 births
2014 deaths
Accidental deaths from falls
Accidental deaths in Switzerland
Album-cover and concert-poster artists
Artist authors
Best Visual Effects Academy Award winners
Fantasy artists
Inkpot Award winners
Swiss occultists
People from Chur
Psychedelic drug advocates
Science fiction artists
Science Fiction Hall of Fame inductees
Swiss contemporary artists
Swiss erotic artists
Swiss graphic designers
Swiss illustrators
Swiss painters
Swiss scenic designers
Swiss speculative fiction artists
Swiss surrealist artists
Zurich University of the Arts alumni